The National Games of Nepal is a sporting event held in Nepal.

Teams

Current teams

Former teams 

 Mechi Zone (1982–1986)
 Kosi Zone (1982–1986)
 Sagarmatha Zone (1982–1986)
 Janakpur Zone (1982–1986)
 Narayani Zone (1982–1986)
 Bagmati Zone (1982–1986)
 Gandaki Zone (1982–1986)
 Dhaulagiri Zone (1982–1986)
 Lumbini Zone (1982–1986)
 Rapti Zone (1982–1986)
 Bheri Zone (1982–1986)
 Karnali Zone (1982–1986)
 Seti Zone (1982–1986)
 Mahakali Zone (1982–1986)
 Eastern Region (1999–2016)
 Central Region (1999–2016)
 Western Region (1999–2016)
 Mid-Western Region (1999–2016)
 Far-Western Region (1999–2016)
 People's Liberation Army (2009–2012)
 University (2012)

Tournament history

Medal table by edition

1982

1984

1986

1999

2009

2012

2016

2019

2022

Events 
Events in bold have taken place since the first tournament.

 Athletics
 Football
 Badminton
 Volleyball
 Chess
 Kabaddi
 Gymnastics
 Table tennis
 Cricket
 Archery
 Weightlifting
 Handball
 Boxing
 Bodybuilding
 Swimming
 Field hockey
 Lawn tennis
 Shooting
 Taekwondo
 Wrestling
 Karate
 Wushu
 Kho kho
 ITF Taekwondo
 Full contact karate
 Basketball
 Judo
 Golf
 Cue sports
 Cycling
 Squash
 Soft tennis
 Paragliding
 Sepak takraw
 Fencing

Previous events 

 Bagh-Chal
Lok Dohori
Folk song
Folk dance

See also 
 Sports in Nepal
 Nepal Olympic Committee
 National Sports Council

References

Sport in Nepal
Multi-sport events in Nepal
Nepal
Recurring sporting events established in 1959
1982 establishments in Nepal